The Caldwell First Nation (meaning: "people of the Lake") is a First Nations band government whose land base is located in Leamington, Ontario, Canada. They are an Anishinaabe group, part of the Three Fires Confederacy, comprising the bands Potawatomi, Odawa, and Ojibwa, whose members are originally of the Mikinaak (Turtle) and the Makwa (Bear) dodems. The Caldwell First Nation are a distinct and federally recognized Indian band and used to be referred to by such names as the "Chippewas of Pelee", "Point Pelee Indians" and "Caldwell's band of Indians."

The Chippewa (also called Ojibwa in Canada) are an Anishinaabe-speaking indigenous nation with people within the borders of present-day Canada and the United States. The Anishinaabe are the largest Native American/First Nation peoples north of Mexico, with nearly 78,000 people among various groups in Canada from western Quebec to British Columbia.

History
The Caldwell First Nation, sometimes also called "the Chippewas of Point Pelee and Pelee Island," lived as a distinct First Nation in the Point Pelee area from before 1763. Their traditional territory encompassed a broad area corresponding to what is now the Ontario region, extending from the Detroit River along Amherstburg all the way to Long Point Ontario and the Lake Erie Islands. The heart of their ancestral territory includes the Essex and Kent county areas, in particular, the Point Pelee Peninsula and Pelee Island. The Caldwell First Nation considers Point Pelee as "our home" and the neighboring Walpole Island First Nation considers Point Pelee as part of "our house."

The Caldwell First Nation served as allies of the British during the War of 1812. In consideration of this service, they were promised land at Point Pelee. The First Nation continued to occupy Point Pelee, with the support of the Canadian government, up until the late 1850s. In the 1920s, many of the band members were forced out of Point Pelee when the Royal Canadian Mounted Police, along with local law enforcement agencies, burned their homes in the area in an effort to force them from their traditional lands.

Land claim

In May 1790, representatives of certain Ottawa (Odawa), Chippewa (Ojibwa), Pottawatomi (Bodéwadmi) people and the Huron (Wendat) surrendered a large tract of land in southwestern Ontario, including Point Pelee. However, the Caldwell First Nation neither signed nor benefited from that treaty. The Crown did not realize this and it was publicly acknowledged by the Department of Indian and Northern Affairs Canada. Caldwell First Nation Council members settled the land claim that had been outstanding for more than 220 years.

The Caldwell First Nation is the only federally recognized Indian band in southern Ontario without a reserve land of its own. The Nation is working towards establishing a reserve, which will finally give members the land base.

References

External links
 
Caldwell First Nation in Point Pelee National Park, The Canadian Encyclopedia
 Caldwell First Nation in Canadian aboriginal reserves article — Encyclopedia britannica
Caldwell First Nation — Southern First Nations Secretariat (Ontario)
Caldwell First Nation —  Indigenous and Northern Affairs Canada

First Nations governments in Ontario
Association of Iroquois and Allied Indians
Leamington, Ontario